Vasil Tomov (born 19 April 1948) is a Bulgarian water polo player. He competed in the men's tournament at the 1972 Summer Olympics.

References

1948 births
Living people
Bulgarian male water polo players
Olympic water polo players of Bulgaria
Water polo players at the 1972 Summer Olympics
Sportspeople from Sofia